Warren Livingstone (born 1973 in Sydney) is an Australian businessman, sports administrator and publican. He is the founder and managing director of the sports-tourism group Fanatics, the former president of Balmain Rugby Club and Sydney pub owner of 4 hotels.

Livingstone played NSW Schoolboys Rugby League and Cricket and attended Sydney Technical High School in Bexley. He started out as a copy boy for Sydney's Daily Telegraph newspaper, whilst at Sydney University studying Politics.

He was a pioneer in the early dot-com boom in Australia before moving to San Francisco in 2000 as founder and CEO of writtenbyme.com a Sydney based dot-com which was funded by a large group of investors including Kevin Weldon and Michael Ball before exiting with a sale to US publisher Simon & Schuster

In 2004 he re-established the Balmain Rugby Club (first formed in 1873 but folded in 1919) and bankrolled the club with a roster of high-profile players including Wallabies Drew Mitchell, Matt Giteau, Ryan Cross, Matt Dunning and French star Sebastian Chabal. Livingstone formed a joint venture between Balmain and the Sydney University club in 2014 to enter the Sydney Stars team in Australia's inaugural National Rugby Championship.

Fanatics

In 1997 he founded the Fanatics to cater for sports fans that follow Australian teams and athletes around the world.

The first sports travel business of its kind, the Fanatics gained notoriety for organizing thousands of fans to attend Australian sporting events around the world. The Fanatics became the official supporter group for Australian Men’s Cricket Team Australia national football team Australia national rugby union team Australia Davis Cup team

Such was the influence of the Fanatics that players demanded they be supported by sports administrators and sometimes withdrew from events in a show of solidarity when they were not taken care of. Lleyton Hewitt was said to have pulled out of the Davis Cup over the treatment of his unofficial supporters at the Australian Open

Fanatics opened offices in Sydney in 1997 and London in 2002 where they sold sports apparel and ran tours to sporting events and the large European cultural events such as Oktoberfest Running of the bulls, La Tomatina and Croatia sailing trips. The London office was closed due to the Covid-19 pandemic.

As of 2022, the Fanatics has over 300,000 members and has organised travel for more than 200,000 fans to sporting events including cricket, football, rugby league and rugby union matches, and also major tennis tournaments and cultural European festivals.

Hotels

In 2014 Livingstone purchased the Charing Cross Hotel in Waverley and renovated it as a gastro pub with a 2 hatted chef; Matt Kemp. In 2018 he purchased Hotel William on William St, Darlinghurst and reopened it as Hyde Park House after a $5 million overhaul.

References

1973 births
Living people
Businesspeople from Sydney
Australian company founders